Soroi Eoe (born 24 December 1954) is a Papua New Guinea politician. He has been a Member of the Papua New Guinea National Parliament since 2017, representing Kikori Open. On 7 June 2019, he was appointed as Minister for Foreign Affairs and Trade and held the position for five months, and later returned to the same position on December 20, 2020.

Early life 
Eoe completed his primary education at Apehava Private School, Menyama Lutheran School, and Lablab Private School. He completed his secondary education at Bumayong Lutheran High School. In 1978, he obtained a Bachelor's Degree in Social Anthropology from the University of Papua New Guinea.

Prior to being elected to the National Parliament, he was a subsistence farmer.

Political career 
He was first elected to the National Parliament in the 2017 general elections for Kikori Open as a member of the PNG National Party. Following his election, he joined People's National Congress. He was then appointed as Minister for Community Development, Youth and Religion in the O'Neill-Abel Cabinet.

During APEC 2018, Eoe hosted a Public Private Dialogue on Women and the Economy.

On 7 June 2019, he was appointed as Minister for Foreign Affairs and Trade in the First Marape Cabinet. Patrick Pruaitch replaced him in the Second Marape Cabinet on 8 November 2019, before being replaced again by Eoe in the same position on December 20, 2020.

References 

Members of the National Parliament of Papua New Guinea
Living people
University of Papua New Guinea alumni
People's National Congress (Papua New Guinea) politicians
Government ministers of Papua New Guinea
1954 births
Foreign Ministers of Papua New Guinea